Cincorunia monstruncus is a species of moth of the family Tortricidae. It is found in Loja Province, Ecuador.

The wingspan is 18 mm. The ground colour of the forewings is cinnamon brown, darker in the costal area than dorsally. The hindwings are pale yellowish cream, mixed orangish apically.

Etymology
The species name refers to the unusual shape of the uncus and is derived from Latin monstrum (meaning something curious).

References

Moths described in 2008
Euliini
Moths of South America
Taxa named by Józef Razowski